John Somers (12 July 1874 – 3 November 1942) was a British sports shooter. He competed in two events at the 1912 Summer Olympics.

References

1874 births
1942 deaths
British male sport shooters
Olympic shooters of Great Britain
Shooters at the 1912 Summer Olympics
People from Hampstead
Sportspeople from London